The 1923–24 SK Rapid Wien season was the 26th season in club history.

Squad

Squad and statistics

Squad statistics

Fixtures and results

League

Cup

References

1923-24 Rapid Wien Season
Rapid